João Lucas may refer to:

 João Lucas (footballer, born 1979) (1979–2015), Portuguese footballer
 João Lucas (footballer, born 1991), Brazilian football left-back
 João Lucas (footballer, born 1996), Portuguese footballer
 João Lucas (footballer, born 1998), Brazilian footballer 
 João Lucas & Marcelo, a sertanejo style Brazilian singing duo